Biondi is an Italian surname. Notable people with the surname include:

Alfredo Biondi (born 1928), Italian politician and lawyer
Dick Biondi (born 1932), Radio Hall of Fame Top 40 and Oldies disc jockey
Ernesto Biondi (1855–1917), Italian sculptor who won the grand prix at the 1900 Exposition Universelle in Paris
Fabio Biondi (born 1961), Italian violinist and conductor
Fabrizio Biondi (born 1954), Italian rower
Ferdinand Biondi, CM, CQ (1909–1998), French Canadian radio broadcaster
Frank Biondi (1945–2019), American businessman
Ivan Franjo Biondić (1572–1644), Croatian-Italian writer, diplomat and historian
Jean Biondi (1900–1950), French politician
Josefa Biondi (1916–2019), Argentine politician
Laurent Biondi (born 1959), French former cyclist
Lawrence Biondi, S.J., president emeritus of Saint Louis University
Lidia Biondi (1941–2016), Italian film and television actress
Marcella Biondi (born 1970), retired Italian alpine skier and freestyle skier
Martha Biondi, American scholar
Mario Biondi (born 1971), Italian singer
Mario Biondi (writer) (born 1939), Italian writer, poet, literary critic, journalist and translator
Matt Biondi (born 1965), three-time U.S. Olympic swimmer, winning 11 medals
Nicola Biondi
Paul Biondi, American composer for television and guitar teacher
Peter J. Biondi (1942–2011), American Republican Party politician, in the New Jersey General Assembly since 1998
Pierluigi Biondi (born 1974), Italian politician
Pietro Fumasoni Biondi (1872–1960), Italian Cardinal of the Roman Catholic Church
Pietro Biondi (born 1939), Italian actor and voice actor
Valentina Costa Biondi (born 1995), Argentinian field hockey player

See also
Stadio Guido Biondi, multi-use stadium in Lanciano, Italy

Italian-language surnames